Events from the year 1791 in Sweden

Incumbents
 Monarch – Gustav III

Events

 Inauguration of the Bergianska trädgården
 Creation of the Ministry for Foreign Affairs (Sweden)
  by Thomas Thorild.
 Fredmans sånger by Carl Michael Bellman.
 Dumboms lefverne by Johan Henric Kellgren.

Births

 29 June – Charlotta Skjöldebrand, court official (died 1866)
 20 June – Carl Fredric Dahlgren, poet  (died 1844)
 Ulrika Möllersvärd, courtier  (died 1878)
 Wendla Åberg, dancer and actress (died 1864)

Deaths

 1 January - Anna Charlotta Schröderheim, salonnière  (born 1754)
 4 April – Elisabeth Lillström, opera singer and actress  (born 1717)
 14 May - Maja-Lisa Borgman, coffee house owner (born 1750s)
 Brita Horn, courtier  (born 1745)

References

 
Years of the 18th century in Sweden